Crataegus wilsonii is a species of hawthorn native to the mountains of southwestern China at elevations of 900 to 3000 meters. It is an ornamental tree, intolerant of summer drought, that is rarely cultivated.

References

wilsonii
Flora of China